Shikhar Ghimirey (Nepali: शिखर घिमिरे) is a Nepali writer. He was born in Lamjung, a western district of Nepal. His first novel Awataar was released in 2017.

Published works
 Awataar (novel)

References 

Nepalese male writers
Nepali-language writers
Living people
People from Chitwan District
People from Lamjung District
Year of birth missing (living people)
21st-century Nepalese writers